The second group stage of the 2000–01 UEFA Champions League was played from 21 November 2000 to 14 March 2001. Eight winners and eight runners up from the first group stage were drawn into four groups of four, each containing two group winners and two runners-up. Teams from the same country or from the same first round group cannot be drawn together. The top two teams from each group advanced to the quarter finals.

Seeding
Seeding was determined by the UEFA coefficients and participants' first group stage positions. Four best-ranked group winners were seeded in Pot 1, the remaining four in Pot 2. Group runners-up were seeded to Pots 3 and 4 accordingly.

Groups

Group A

Group B

Group C

Group D

References

External links
 2000–01 second group stage matches at UEFA.com

Group Stage 2
2000-01 2